Richard Green is an American actor, director and musician with an international career in voice over and film. He had a prominent role as the Magician, in David Lynch's Mulholland Drive and produced I Don't Know Jack, about the life and mysterious death of Eraserhead star Jack Nance. His feature directorial debut was for the film 7 Year ZigZag (uniquely told entirely in rhyme and original swing and jazz). He was also the voice for DC Comics character Professor Hugo Strange in The Batman animated series, replacing Frank Gorshin after Gorshin's death. He also voiced Benmummy in the Cartoon Network series Ben 10.

Green is also an accomplished singer-songwriter, with two albums and the feature film 7 Year ZigZag to his credit. His songs have appeared such films as Burn Hollywood Burn and Strangers in Paradise. His TV credits as an actor include The West Wing.

His production company Next Step Studios is responsible for scores of commercial and award-winning shorts as well as two feature films and the development of The Video Biography Company.

Green received his BFA in acting from California Institute of the Arts (Theater BFA 77).

Filmography

Film

Television

Video Games

References

External links 

richardgreenvo.com
nextstepstudios.com

American male voice actors
American male television actors
American television producers
American male screenwriters
Place of birth missing (living people)
American film directors
Living people
American singer-songwriters
American jazz singers
Year of birth missing (living people)